2014 FIBA Asia Cup was the 5th FIBA Asia Cup, a top-level international basketball tournament of FIBA Asia. The tournament was held in Wuhan, Hubei, China from 11–19 July 2014. Iran won the tournament by defeating Chinese Taipei 89–79 in the final and thus automatically qualified for the 2015 FIBA Asia Championship to be held in China.

Qualification 

According to the FIBA Asia rules, the number of participating teams in the 2014 FIBA Asia Cup is ten (10). Each zone had one place, and the hosts (China) and the defending FIBA Asia Championship titleholder (Iran) were automatically qualified. The other two places were allocated to the zones according to performance in the 2013 FIBA Asia Championship; as a result, Southeast Asia and East Asia zones were allocated an additional berth each.

In the event of a withdrawal or non-participation by qualified teams, FIBA Asia 
has the right to invite other teams, while endeavoring to maintain, as far as possible, a certain balance between Sub-Zones.

Included are teams' FIBA World Ranking prior to the tournament.

Notes:
 (ranked 34th) selected as a wild card for replacement of a team from the Gulf sub-zone.
 (ranked 71st) withdrew, leaving four teams in Group B. They were not replaced.

Draw 
The draw was held on June 8, 2014 at Wuhan Sports Center in Wuhan, Hubei, China.

Preliminary round

Group A

|}

Group B

|}

Final round
The teams in this round will be the Top 4 teams per group

Quarterfinals

Semifinals 5th–8th

Semifinals

7th place

5th place

3rd place

Final

Final standing

Awards

Most Valuable Player:  Hamed Haddadi
 PG –  Zirui Wang
 SG –  Paul Lee
 SF –  Arsalan Kazemi
 PF –  Quincy Davis
 C –  Hamed Haddadi

References

Asia Cup
Asia Cup 2014
FIBA Asia Cup 2014
FIBA Asia Challenge
International basketball competitions hosted by China
Sport in Wuhan